S. S. Institute of Medical Sciences & Research Centre (also referred to as SSIMS&RC) is a Medical school located in Davanagere, Karnataka, India. It is affiliated to the Rajiv Gandhi University of Health Sciences, Bengaluru.

References

Medical colleges in Karnataka
Colleges affiliated to Rajiv Gandhi University of Health Sciences
Education in Davangere
Universities and colleges in Davanagere district